The Senshu Bank, Ltd. (株式会社泉州銀行; Kabushikigaisha Senshu Ginkō) is a Japanese bank, headquartered in Kishiwada with 63 branches. It is involved in loaning, credit cards, leasing, and the development and sale of computer software.
It is traded on the Osaka Securities Exchange under symbol 8372.

History
The bank was founded in 1951.

Shareholders
Mitsubishi UFJ Financial Group
The Bank of Tokyo-Mitsubishi UFJ

External links
The Senshu Bank website (in Japanese)
Google Finance.com: The Senshu Bank financial information

Regional banks of Japan
Mitsubishi UFJ Financial Group
Banks established in 1951
Japanese companies established in 1951

zh:泉州银行